Jayanth Jambulingam Chandrasekhar (born April 9, 1968) is an American comedian, film director, screenwriter, and actor. He is best known for his work with the sketch comedy group Broken Lizard and for directing and starring in the Broken Lizard films Super Troopers, Club Dread, Beerfest and Super Troopers 2. Since 2001, he has also worked frequently as a television director, directing many episodes of Community and The Goldbergs, among dozens of other comedy series. He has also occasionally worked as a film director outside of Broken Lizard projects, most notably on the 2005 film The Dukes of Hazzard.

Early life and education 
Chandrasekhar was born in Chicago to parents who lived in the adjacent suburb of Oak Park, Illinois. Both his father, Arcot Jambulingam "AJ" Chandrasekhar, and his mother, Hema Chandrasekhar, are physicians of Tamil origin and are originally from Chennai, India. The hospital where he was born, old Cook County Hospital, was where his parents worked. Chandrasekhar has an older sister as well as a younger sister named Sandy Chandrasekhar, who are both lawyers.

Chandrasekhar lived in Oak Park until his family moved farther west from Chicago to the suburb of Hinsdale. He graduated from the boarding high school Lake Forest Academy. He graduated from Colgate University with a major in European history and a minor in philosophy. During college he spent a semester at Chicago's Loyola University.

Career

Broken Lizard comedy troupe 
Chandrasekhar formed the troupe Broken Lizard with other former members of the comedy troupe, Charred Goosebeak, and Beta Theta Pi, people he met during college at Colgate University. Chandrasekhar said he found his path to comedy after acting in high school and college. He did some open mic standup comedy work in Chicago and founded a sketch group called "Charred Goose Beak" at college. After moving to New York, the group was renamed Broken Lizard.

Chandrasekhar began making shorts featuring the troupe, then made the self-funded movie Puddle Cruiser in 1996. The film made it into the Sundance Film Festival in 1997. Then in 2001, they made Super Troopers as an independent movie, which Harvey Weinstein helped to develop at Miramax Films, but did not end up distributing.

Directing 
In 2005, Chandrasekhar directed The Dukes of Hazzard. The action comedy film based on the 1970s American television series of the same name was the debut of pop singer Jessica Simpson as an actress. While financially successful, the film was met with negative reviews from critics. He has become an established television comedy director, directing episodes of Undeclared, Happy Endings, Chuck, Community, Psych, New Girl, and Arrested Development. He says that the earlier a director joins a show, the more impact he or she will have on its look and feel.

In 2012, Chandrasekhar made the movie The Babymakers. He directed several episodes of Blue Mountain State. Amazon released a pilot in the 2014 Amazon Original Series that he wrote and directed called Really.

Between 2014 and 2018, he directed 16 episodes of The Goldbergs.

In June 2018, the filmmaker revealed that he is in discussions with Marvel Studios to direct one of their upcoming movies.

In February 2021, Chandrasekhar was announced as the director of the family comedy Easter Sunday, starring Jo Koy.

Acting 
Chandrasekhar guest starred alongside his cousin Sendhil Ramamurthy in a 2009 episode of Psych which Chandrasekhar also directed. He appeared as the cab driver in the "Terror Taxi" skit from Jackass: Number Two. He appeared as racist comedian Gupta Gupti Gupta in the episode "Basic Email Security" of Community.

Stand-up 
Chandrasekhar often does stand-up comedy, sometimes touring with fellow Broken Lizard friends, Steve Lemme and Kevin Heffernan. His stand-up is a mix of jokes and stories.

Personal life 
Chandrasekhar has been married to actress Susan Clarke since 2005. They have three children: twin daughters and a son. Chandrasekhar's middle name, Jambulingam, is in honor of his grandfather, and is also his son's middle name. He used the name Jumbulingam for his editorial credits in Puddle Cruiser and Super Troopers.

Chandrasekhar's cousin is the actor Sendhil Ramamurthy, who played the role of Mohinder Suresh in the NBC superhero drama Heroes and also appeared in the Broken Lizard film The Slammin' Salmon.

Filmography

Films

Acting roles

Editor
 Los Enchiladas! (1999)
 Two Ninas (1999)

Television

Director

Acting roles

References

External links 
 

1968 births
Living people
20th-century American male actors
21st-century American male actors
Male actors from Illinois
American male film actors
American male television actors
American male voice actors
American Hindus
American male screenwriters
American people of Indian Tamil descent
American television directors
American film directors of Indian descent
American male writers
American male actors of Indian descent
Broken Lizard
Colgate University alumni
Comedy film directors
Lake Forest Academy alumni
Male actors from Chicago
Film directors from Illinois
Screenwriters from New York (state)
Screenwriters from Illinois